Ann Prentiss (November 27, 1939 – January 12, 2010) was an American actress.

Early life
Prentiss was born Ann Elizabeth Ragusa in San Antonio, Texas, to Paulene (née Gardner) and Thomas J. Ragusa. Her father was of Sicilian descent. Her elder sister, Paula Prentiss, is also an actress.

Career 
Prentiss had many supporting roles in films and television series in the 1960s, 1970s and 1980s, including [[List of Get Smart episodes#Season 3: 1967.E2.80.9368|Get Smart'''s "The Little Black Book"]], Hogan's Heroes' "The Missing Klink" (1969), and on the Baretta episode "Half a Million Dollar Baby". She provided the voice of an alien species in the comedy film My Stepmother Is an Alien (1988), co-starring alongside Kim Basinger and Dan Aykroyd. Her other film roles included appearances in Any Wednesday (1966), If He Hollers, Let Him Go! (1968), The Out-of-Towners (1970), and California Split (1974), opposite George Segal and Elliott Gould.

In the 1967 NBC-TV series Captain Nice'', created by Buck Henry, Prentiss played Police Sgt. Candy Kane, the girlfriend of the title character, a shy chemist/superhero portrayed by William Daniels.

Personal life

Criminal conviction
Prentiss was convicted in a California court of a 1996 assault against her father, and a subsequent threat against members of her family. The district attorney claimed that Prentiss, while incarcerated on the assault charge, had attempted to hire another inmate to kill three people, including her father and actor-director Richard Benjamin, the husband of her sister. On July 23, 1997, the court sentenced her to 19 years in prison.

Death
Prentiss died in prison on January 12, 2010.

References

External links 
 

1939 births
2010 deaths
20th-century American actresses
Actresses from San Antonio
American film actresses
American people of Italian descent
American television actresses
American people who died in prison custody
21st-century American women
American people convicted of assault
Prisoners who died in California detention